The men's long jump event at the 1951 Pan American Games was held at the Estadio Monumental in Buenos Aires on 28 February.

Results

References

Athletics at the 1951 Pan American Games
1951